Claudia is a 1943 American comedy-drama film directed by Edmund Goulding, and written by Morrie Ryskind. The film stars Dorothy McGuire, Robert Young, Ina Claire, Reginald Gardiner, Olga Baclanova, and Jean Howard. The film was released on November 4, 1943, by 20th Century Fox. The film was based on a Broadway play of the same name from 1941.  It is followed by a sequel in 1946 Claudia and David.

Robert Young said of his co-star, “She'd done it on Broadway and this was mostly a photographed play. Ina Claire was wonderful as her mother. It did sensational business and Fox requested a sequel. Dorothy was aghast and said she'd never do a sequel, but technically, she was under contract to Selznick and he simply put his foot down and Claudia and David duly appeared in 1946 and was almost as big a hit.”

Plot
Child bride Claudia Naughton (Dorothy McGuire) has made life difficult for her husband David (Robert Young) because she can't stand living so far away from her mother. She's also afraid her husband doesn't find her desirable enough. To remedy both situations, she plans to sell their farm to an opera singer so they'll have to move back to the city near her mother, and she tries to make her husband jealous by flirting with a neighbor. Eventually, Claudia has to learn to grow when she discovers that she's about to become a mother and that her own mother is gravely ill.

Cast 
 Dorothy McGuire as Claudia Naughton
 Robert Young as David Naughton
 Ina Claire as Mrs. Brown
 Reginald Gardiner as Jerry Seymour
 Olga Baclanova as Madame Daruschka
 Jean Howard as Julia
 Frank Tweddell as Fritz
 Elsa Janssen as Bertha

References

External links 
 
 
 
 

1943 films
1943 comedy-drama films
20th Century Fox films
American black-and-white films
American comedy-drama films
American films based on plays
1940s English-language films
Films about marriage
Films directed by Edmund Goulding
Films scored by Alfred Newman
Films set in Connecticut
Films produced by William Perlberg
1940s American films